Mastacembelus albomaculatus is a species of fish in the family Mastacembelidae. It is endemic to Lake Tanganyika and is found in Burundi, the Democratic Republic of the Congo, Tanzania, and Zambia. It is found in rocky zones in the coastal area s of the lake.

References

albomaculatus
Fish of Lake Tanganyika
Taxonomy articles created by Polbot
Fish described in 1953
Taxobox binomials not recognized by IUCN